"Gold Skies" is a song by Dutch electronic music producer and DJ Sander van Doorn, Dutch DJ and record producer Martin Garrix and Canadian electronic music duo DVBBS, featuring vocals from Canadian singer Aleesia. It was released as a digital download on 2 June 2014 on Beatport and on 16 June 2014 on iTunes. The song has charted in Belgium. The song was produced by Sander Van Doorn, Martin Garrix, DVBBS and Aleesia.

Music video
The music video to accompany the song "Gold Skies", was uploaded officially on YouTube on 17 May 2014.

The music video features a couple on a camping trip. The first scene features them fighting after the man dislikes the burgers that are cooked on a barbecue. Later, the man is filling their van with petrol but gets angry and runs away. The girl then finds the van and sets off to find the man, who is seen at a burger place in a town. When the girl finds the man, she tells him to get into the van again. It is unknown where their final destination is. The music video was filmed in Iceland, located in western Europe. Russian car UAZ-452 is seen on a music video

Chart performance

Weekly charts

Year-end charts

Release history

References

2014 singles
2014 songs
Martin Garrix songs
Spinnin' Records singles
Songs written by Martin Garrix